Navidad de Los Andes is an album by Argentine bandoneon player and composer Dino Saluzzi with cellist Anja Lechner and saxophonist Felix Saluzzi recorded in 2010 and released on the ECM label.

Reception
The Allmusic review by Thom Jurek awarded the album 4 stars stating "While the music here is often brooding, it is never less than poetic, and often approaches the sublime".

Track listing
All compositions by Dino Saluzzi except as indicated
 "Flor de Tuna" - 7:39 
 "Sucesos" - 6:47 
 "Fragments" - 3:36 
 "Son Qo'ñati" - 3:40 
 "Requerdos de Bohemia" (Enrique Delfino, Manuel Romero) - 7:45 
 "Gabriel Kondor" - 6:01 
 "El Vals de Nostros" (Carlos Aparicio, Saluzzi) - 3:22 
 "Candor/Soledad" (Carlos Gardel, Saluzzi) - 4:07 
 "Variaciones Sobre una Melodía Popular de José L. Padula" - 6:58 
 "Ronda de Niños en la Montaña" - 5:15 
 "Otoño" - 5:18 
Recorded at Auditorio Radiotelevisione Svizzera in Lugano, Switzerland in July 2010

Personnel
Dino Saluzzi — bandoneón
Anja Lechner — cello
Felix Saluzzi — tenor saxophone

References

ECM Records albums
Dino Saluzzi albums
2011 albums
Albums produced by Manfred Eicher